is a Prefectural Natural Park in Yamagata Prefecture, Japan. Established in 1971, the park spans the borders of the municipalities of Sakata, Shōnai, and Tozawa. The park's central feature is the eponymous Mogami River.

See also
 National Parks of Japan

References

Parks and gardens in Yamagata Prefecture
Sakata, Yamagata
Shōnai, Yamagata
Tozawa, Yamagata
Protected areas established in 1971
1971 establishments in Japan